Góra Ziuty  (lit. Ziuta's Mountain; ger. Buchberg, 631 m a.s.l.) - the highest peak of Krzeszowskie Wzgórza, within Kotlina Kamiennogórska in Central Sudetes.

Position 
The peak is located in the northern part of the Krzeszowskie Wzgórza.

Bibliography 
 Słownik geografii turystycznej Sudetów, tom 8 Kotlina Kamiennogórska, Wzgórza Bramy Lubawskiej, Zawory, red. Marek Staffa, Wydawnictwo I-BiS, Wrocław 1997, s. 171 i 172
 Sudety Środkowe. Skala 1:40000. Jelenia Góra: Wydawnictwo Turystyczne Plan, 2005. 

Mountain peaks of the Krzeszowskie Wzgórza